Slinger High School is a public high school in Slinger, Wisconsin (U.S.). It is administered by the Slinger School District. Its athletic teams are named the Owls. 

The school's marching band performed at the 2001 Presidential Inauguration parade and the 2009 London New Year's Day Parade, as well as performing in Hawaii for the Thanksgiving Day Parade.

References

External links
 

Public high schools in Wisconsin
Schools in Washington County, Wisconsin